Chotti Bahu is an Indian drama television series produced by DJ's a Creative Unit. Season one aired from 8 December 2008 to 17 September 2010 and season two aired from 15 February 2011 to 18 May 2012 on Zee TV. It starred Rubina Dilaik as Radhika and Avinash Sachdev as Dev. Sasural Simar Ka 2 Serial was inspired by this story .

Plot
Choti Bahu is the love saga of two soulmates Dev and Radhika.

Season 1
Shastriji and Devaki live in a Vrindavan, and they have two daughters, Radhika (Rubina Dilaik), who is an adopted child, and Vishakha Shastri (Priyanka Tiwari). Radhika is simple and dutiful, whereas Vishakha wants to be an actress in Bollywood. She is headstrong and selfish. Vishakha and Radhika share a close bond. The Purohits are a well to do from Delhi and have their ancestral home in Vrindavan. They have two sons - Vivek and Dev (Avinash Sachdev). The Purohits have great expectations from Dev who falls in love with Radhika. But fate wills otherwise, and he thinks he marries Vishakha due to a confusion. The story takes a dramatic turn when Radhika enters Dev's house, and the stage is set for an unusual love triangle, with each character grappling with peculiar dilemmas.

Season 2 
Ruby Bhardwaj (Rubina Dilaik), a Brahmin by birth, was adopted and brought up by a family of weavers in a small town called Rawal. Dev (Avinash Sachdev), whose family has been in the service of Rajpurohits for generations, visits Rawal as a child on the occasion of Radhashtami. Dev and Radhika meet each other and become good friends. Radhika and Dev get married at a young age whilst playing.

Cast

Season 1

Main
 Rubina Dilaik as Radhika Purohit
 Avinash Sachdev as Dev Purohit

Recurring
 Abhinav Shukla as Vikram
 Gopi Desai as Vinodini "Ammaji" Shastri
 Keerti Gaekwad Kelkar as Mrinalini Vivek Purohit
 Rajeev Kumar as Vivek Purohit
 Hiten Tejwani as Shantanu Purohit
 Harjot Singh Dhaliwal as Chota Purohit
 Prabha Sinha as Vaishali Raj Purohit
 Priyanka Tiwari as Vishakha Shastri 
 Rishi Khurana as Birju
 Snehal Sahay as Mrs Purohit
 Rita Bhaduri as Shanti Purohit
 Samta Sagar as Devaki Brijmohan Shastri 
 Rajeev Verma as Pandit Brijmohan Shastri
 Raj Logani as Arjun Purohit
 Sanjay Batra as Sushil Purohit
 Darshan Kumar as Purab
 Shashank Sethi as Keshav Chaubey
 Surendra Pal as Raj Purohit
 Sonia Singh as Kanika Yaduvanshi
 Vineet Kumar Chaudhary as Rajjan Yaduvanshi
 Sheeba Chaddha as Katyani Yaduvanshi 
 Drashti Dhami (Guest)
 Divyanka Tripathi as Vidya
 Prachi Desai as Bani
 Ankita Lokhande as Archana
 Rajshree Thakur as Saloni

Season 2

Main
 Rubina Dilaik as Radhika Purohit
 Avinash Sachdev as Dev Purohit

Recurring
 Gopi Desai as Dai Maa
 Benaf Dadachandji as Barkha
 Sourav Chakraborty as Rohan Harinath Purohit
 Micckie Dudaaney as Virat Gopaldas Purohit 
 Sushmita Daan as Padma Harinath Purohit
 Rakesh Pandey as Dadaji 
 Sangeeta Kapure as Mohini Virat Purohit
 Chayan Trivedi as Gopaldas Purohit
 Aditya Lakhia as Mansaram  
 Sidharth Sen as Chhenu
 Garima Shrivastav as Shanti Radhika's stepmother
 Shivam Jagtap as Chhenu (young age)
 Nishant Shokeen / Pracheen Chauhan as Lord Krishna  
 Aman Verma as Asur / Vishwanath
 Vinay Jain as Rishikesh Bhardwaj (RB) 
 Kishwer Merchant as Sonia Rishikesh Bhardwaj
 Vijayendra Kumeria as Jolly Bhardwaj
 Srishty Rode as Radha Rani / Madhvi
Ahmad Harhash as Ranjeet Roy Bhardwaj

Series overview
The show had two seasons titled Chotti Bahu – Sindoor Bin Suhagan and Chhoti Bahu - Sawar Ke Rang Rachi. Chotti Bahu season one created history by extending the prime time slot to early prime time 7:30 pm. The second season was brought back on public demand with a new plot and same lead actors.

Distribution

The series was popular in Mauritius, the West Indies, Romania, the United States, Trinidad, Malaysia, Thailand, Uganda, Guyana and South Africa. Chotti Bahu season rerun was aired in Zee Anmol in India and Zee Lamhe in the UK during 2014 and 2015. The show was also broadcast on MBC Digital 4 in Mauritius.

Dubbed version of the serial was telecast in Tamil language as Chinna Marumagal in Zee Tamil. It was remade twice in Telugu language as Chinna Kodalu and Vaidehi Parinayam which aired on Zee Telugu and remade in Kannada as Radha Kalyana which aired on Zee Kannada.

The series currently airs on Zee Zindagi from 23 May 2016 under the title Vrindawan ki Radhika. The channel has picked the show as it features a universal theme, which is a reflection of the channel's brand promise of providing its viewers with Bemisal Kahaniyan. The series is running on Zee Anmol since 29 April 2019 to 5 January 2020 the series again ran on Zee TV from 16 August 2019. The series again re-ran on Zee Anmol since 10 June 2020.  Season 2 started re-running on Big Magic from 14 December 2020.

References

External links
 Official Website

Indian television soap operas
Zee TV original programming
2008 Indian television series debuts
2011 Indian television series debuts
2010 Indian television series endings
2012 Indian television series endings
Television shows set in Uttar Pradesh